Marvin Esor (born July 21, 1989 in Paris) is a Martiniquais professional footballer. Currently, he plays in the Championnat National 3 for FC Bassin d'Arcachon.

Career

Club career

Esor started his career with Bordeaux B.

After a two-year break, Esor returned to football, joining FC Bassin d'Arcachon in the summer 2018. He was later also appointed head coach for the club's U14 team.

References

External links
 
 

1989 births
Living people
Footballers from Paris
Martiniquais footballers
Martinique international footballers
French footballers
French people of Martiniquais descent
Ligue 2 players
Championnat National 3 players
AC Arlésien players
Clermont Foot players
LB Châteauroux players
US Créteil-Lusitanos players

2014 Caribbean Cup players
Association football defenders